Lophoturus is a genus of millipedes belonging to the family Lophoproctidae. Species described after year 2000 include two from Queensland, Australia, three from Christmas Island, Australia, and three from the Caribbean and northern South America.

Species
There are approximately 27 species:
Lophoturus adisi Ishii, Jacquemin-Nguyen Duy & Condé, 1999
Lophoturus aequatus (Loomis, 1936)
Lophoturus anisorhabdus (Condé & Terver, 1964)
Lophoturus boondallus Huynh & Veenstra, 2018
Lophoturus crassipes Conde & Terver, 1979
Lophoturus danhomenou (Brölemann, 1926)
Lophoturus difficilis (Condé & Jacquemin, 1963)
Lophoturus drifti (Condé & Terver, 1964)
Lophoturus fluctuans (Condé & Terver, 1964)
Lophoturus guineensis (Silvestri, 1948)
Lophoturus hesperius (Condè & Terver, 1963)
Lophoturus humphreysi Nguyen Duy-Jacquemin 2014
Lophoturus jianshuiensis Ishii & Yin, 2000
Lophoturus judsoni Jacquemin-Nguyen Duy, 2002
Lophoturus longisetis (Pocock, 1894)
Lophoturus madecassus (Marquet & Condé, 1950)
Lophoturus molloyensis Huynh & Veenstra, 2018
Lophoturus monserratensis Jacquemin-Nguyen Duy, 2002
Lophoturus niveus (Loomis, 1934)
Lophoturus obscurus (Brölemann, 1931)
Lophoturus okinawai (Nguyen Duy-Jacquemin & Condé, 1982)
Lophoturus peruanus (Silvestri, 1949)
Lophoturus quebradanus (Chamberlin, 1955)
Lophoturus queenslandicus (Verhoeff, 1924)
Lophoturus speophilus Nguyen Duy-Jacquemin 2014
Lophoturus sturmi Jacquemin-Nguyen Duy, 2002
Lophoturus vicarius Conde & Terver, 1979

References

External links
Reproduction, egg morphology and development observed in two Australian penicillate millipedes, Lophoturus queenslandicus (Lophoproctidae) and Phryssonotus novaehollandiae (Synxenidae) (Diplopoda)

Polyxenida
Millipede genera